is a railway station on the Osaka Metro Sennichimae Line and the Hanshin Railway Hanshin Namba Line in Naniwa-ku, Osaka, Japan.

Lines

 (Station Number: S15)
Hanshin Electric Railway 
Hanshin Namba Line (Station Number: HS 42)

Layout

Osaka Metro Sennichimae Line

This station has an island platform serving 2 tracks underground.

Hanshin Railway Hanshin Namba Line

This station has an island platform serving 2 tracks underground. There are 2 returning tracks for the trains of Kintetsu in the west of the station.

Train crew take turns at operation or conducting between Kintetsu and Hanshin. Trains are operated by Kintetsu crew between this station and Ōsaka Namba Station.

Surroundings
Shiomibashi Station – Nankai Railway Koya Line (Shiomibashi Branch)
Naniwa Hospital
Naniwa-suji
Nishi-Dotombori River
Amidaike-suji

Adjacent stations

|-

	

Railway stations in Japan opened in 1969
Railway stations in Japan opened in 2009
Railway stations in Osaka Prefecture
Stations of Hanshin Electric Railway
Osaka Metro stations